Narada Mahathera, born Sumanapala Perera (14 July 1898 – 2 October 1983) was a Theravada Buddhist monk, scholar, translator, educator and Buddhist missionary who was for many years the Superior of Vajiraramaya in Colombo, Sri Lanka. He was a popular figure in his native country, Sri Lanka, and beyond.

Biography
He was born in Kotahena, Colombo to a middle-class family, educated at St. Benedict's College and Ceylon University College, and ordained at the age of eighteen.

In 1929 he represented Sri Lanka at the opening ceremony for the new Mulagandhakuti vihara at Sarnath, India, and in 1934 he visited Indonesia, the first Theravadan monk to do so in more than 450 years. During this opportunity he planted and blessed a bodhi tree in southeastern side of Borobudur on 10 March 1934, and some Upasakas were ordained as monks. From that point on he travelled to many countries to conduct missionary work: Taiwan, Cambodia, Laos, South Vietnam, Singapore, Japan, Nepal, and Australia. In 1956, he visited the United Kingdom and the United States, and addressed a huge crowd at the Washington Monument. On 2 November 1960, Narada Maha Thera brought a bodhi tree to the South Vietnamese temple Thích Ca Phật Đài, and made many visits to the country during the 1960s.

Along with others (such as Piyadassi Maha Thera) he contributed to the popularization of the bana style Dhamma talk in the 1960s and brought the Buddhist teachings "to the day-to-day lives of the Westernized middle class in Sri Lanka."

Bibliography
The Buddha and his Teachings Fourth Edition: Buddhist Missionary Society, Kuala Lumpur, Malaysia, 1988.  
Buddhism in a Nutshell
The Buddhist Doctrine of Kamma and Rebirth
Kandaraka Sutta; Potaliya Sutta: Discourses from the Majjhima Nikaya
Apannaka Sutta, Cula Malunkya Sutta, Upali Sutta: Discourses from the Majjhima Nikaya
Manual of Abhidhamma
An Elementary Pali Course
Life of Venerable Sariputta
Everyman’s Ethics
Facts of Life
Dhammapada, Pali text and translation
The Way to Nibbana
The Mirror of the Dhamma: a manual of Buddhist recitations and devotional texts
An Outline of Buddhism
The Life of Buddha, in his own words

References

External links

A Manual of Abhidhamma by Narada Mahathera

Sri Lankan Buddhist monks
1898 births
1983 deaths
Sri Lankan Buddhist missionaries
Alumni of the Ceylon University College
Sinhalese monks
20th-century Buddhist monks